Tomasz Makowiecki (born 10 June 1983, in Gdynia) is a Polish musician, singer and songwriter.

History

Idol and Makowiecki Band (2002–2005)
Makowiecki became popular in 2002 as one of the finalists in the first season of Polish TV series Idol, where he finished fifth. Following that, he signed a record deal with the Polish division of BMG. Makowiecki became the frontman of a band called Makowiecki Band, and released his debut album with the group in December 2002. It was followed by the release of Piosenki na NIE in 2005.

Ostatnie wspólne zdjęcie and NO! NO! NO! (2007–2011)
In 2007, Makowiecki released his third studio album, titled Ostatnie wspólne zdjęcie.
A year later, he started a band called NO! NO! NO! with Przemysław Myszor and Wojciech Powaga, musicians for the Polish alternative rock band Myslovitz. The group's debut album NO! NO! NO! was released in March 2010, and received two nominations for the Polish music award Fryderyk.

Return to solo career (2013–present)
Makowiecki's first solo album in seven years, Moizm, was released in October 2013. It is promoted by the single "Holidays in Rome".

Personal life
In 2008, Makowiecki married Polish pop singer Reni Jusis. They are both vegetarians. The couple has two children, son Teofil (born on 1 January 2010) and daughter Gaja (born 2012). They divorced in April 2019.

Discography

Studio albums

Singles

References

External links

 

1983 births
Living people
People from Gdynia
Polish pop singers
Polish rock singers
Polish lyricists
21st-century Polish male singers
21st-century Polish singers